The Freckled Rascal is a 1929 American silent Western film directed by Louis King and starring Buzz Barton, Milburn Morante and Lotus Thompson.

Cast
 Buzz Barton as Red Hepner 
 Milburn Morante as Hank Robbins 
 Thomas G. Lingham as Follansbee 
 Lotus Thompson as Sally 
 Pat J. O'Brien as Jim Kane 
 Bill Patton as Bill Latham

References

External links
 

1929 films
1929 Western (genre) films
American black-and-white films
Films directed by Louis King
Film Booking Offices of America films
Silent American Western (genre) films
1920s English-language films
1920s American films